Aliste may refer to several municipalities in comarca of Aliste, in the Zamora province of northern Spain:

Mahide de Aliste
Rábano de Aliste
Riofrío de Aliste

Alternately, it may refer to a comarca (shire) within Zamora:

Aliste (shire)